Mayor of Karachi is the executive of the Karachi metropolitan corporation and the Karachi local government system of the city of Karachi which is the third tier of governance in Pakistan after Federal and provincial governments.

Presently the post resides with Sindh government appointed Administrator until elections are held.

History

Ancient local government system in South Asia 
The history of Karachi dates back to ancient periods. Before the Christian era, various towns and cities existed near the present day Karachi such as Barbarikon, Debal, and Banbhore. Local government system in the Indian subcontinent dates back to Mauryan empire or earlier. Public drains and sewage system, solid waste management, public dust bins, and street lamps at Mohenjo Daro indicate the presence of municipal organizations and services. During the Mauryan empire, a council of thirty commissioners was divided into six committees or boards which governed the city of Pataliputra and handled affairs such as fixing wages, controlling manufacturing and supplies, arrangement of foreign dignitaries, tourists and foreigners, handling records and registrations, collection of sales taxes, trade regulation, issuing licenses for weights and measurements, and municipal responsibilities. During ancient times, the Mayor of the city was called Nagarika and in the medieval periods, Kotwals came to administer major towns and cities. The mayors were appointed by the King rather than being elected. The Panchayat (assembly of five elders) system traced in the Rig Veda back to 1200 BC (Alok 2006).

British Indian Empire 
The first local government elections in Karachi were held on 1 November 1884 and Karachi municipality was authorized to elect its president. Jamshed Nusserwanji Mehta became the first elected mayor of Karachi in 1933 when Karachi municipal corporation was first created from Karachi municipal committee, he served as the president of the Karachi municipal committee for 20 years prior. Owing to multiethnic composition, the different religious groups took turns as mayors of Karachi such as Parsis, Muslims, Hindus and Christians until the Independence of Pakistan in 1947.

Post Independence 
First unofficial party based mayors were elected during the era of Zia ul Haq and Jamaat-e-Islami politician Abdul Sattar Afghani became the first mayor of Karachi with predominant political representation though the mayors remained unauthoritative. During the presidential rule of Gen. Pervez Musharraf, the local governments were reinstated with much better powers and control, which lasted until 2010. Under directives of Pakistan Supreme court in 2016, the local government system was revived but the provincial amendments to the local government act diminished the mayoral authority  which once again became superficial and powerless.

Administrative divisions 

The current Karachi Local Government System follows Sindh Local Government Act 2013 (SLGA 2013)

The Karachi Local Government consists of Karachi Metropolitan Corporation which is subdivided into of 7 District Municipal Corporations (DMCs) which are headed by Chairmen and Deputy Chairmen. the districts or Zila of Karachi Local Government as of Sindh local government act 2013 are District Central, District West, District East, District South, Malir  Korangi and Keamari District. Each district is further divided into Union Committees (UCs) which are headed by Chairmen and vice chairmen. Each Union committee is further sub divided into four wards. The Local government elections directly elect the UC chairmen/vice chairmen panel and the 4 ward members of each UC. the seats are reserved for women, non Muslim minorities, youth members and labours in a Union Committee all of which are indirectly elected by the direct election of chairman/vice chairman panel.

The chairman of a Union committee belongs to the City council/KMC and elects the Mayor/deputy mayor candidate, while the Vice Chairman of Union Committee elects the chairman/Vice chairman of District Municipal corporation (DMC) and works in District municipal corporation office.

The City Hall 

The historic and iconic building of Karachi Metropolitan Corporation (KMC) houses the offices of mayor and deputy mayor of the city and the city council Hall with 304 members (Union committee chairmen). The foundation of the building was laid in 1927 and the construction was completed on 1930. the cost of building was 1,725,000 RS.

KDA Scheme 1 in Gulshan-e-Iqbal 'Camp Office' is the official residence for the Deputy Mayor of Karachi.

List of Mayors

Mayors of Karachi (1933 - 1962) 
Karachi mayors were elected through Karachi Municipal Corporation elections or appointed.

Mayors of Karachi (1979 - Present) 

Former President of Pakistan Zia ul Haq conducted first popular local government elections in 1979 which were non party based but the parties still fielded their candidates. The victorious mayor Abdul Sattar Afghani was affiliated with Jamaat-e-Islami.

Election 

The most recent Local government elections were held in 2015 and mayor elections took place through voting of chairmen of union committees (members of KMC) on 24 August 2016.

* The 308 directly and indirectly elected members of Union Committee of KMC voted for Mayor of Karachi on 24 August 2016. Waseem Akhter comfortably defeated 6 party alliance formed to contest against the city's dominant political force, the MQM

PTI Karachi leader Faisal Vawda submitted petition for the disqualification of Karachi mayor-elect Waseem Akhter few hours before his oath taking ceremony in the Sindh High Court. Sindh High Court withdrew his production orders and all sessions judges in Karachi were stopped from administering the oath after not getting clearance from the Sindh High Court. Faisal Vawda petition was later rejected and second production orders were issued.

Waseem Akhter was crowned mayor of Karachi on 30 August 2016. Ceremony was held at Polo Ground.

Authority 
According to Sindh Assembly parliamentarian, Khurrum Sher Zaman, the outgoing Karachi mayor, Waseem Akhter was powerless.

The Outgoing mayor, Waseem Akhter stated that the Karachi Development Authority (KDA), Karachi Water and Sewerage Board (KW&SB), Karachi Building Control Authority (KBCA; renamed to SBCA), the Karachi Revenue Department, the Karachi Land Registry, KMTA, the Karachi Department of Transportation (now SMTA), and the KSWMA (now SSWMA) were removed from Karachi Metropolitan Corporation (KMC) and merged into the KDA. The Karachi Development Authority (KDA) itself was divided into the Malir Development Authority and Lyari Development Authority. Most powers of these city agencies were taken over by the Sindh provincial government for instance by creation of Sindh government bodies like Sindh Building Control Authority. (SBCA). According to SLGA 2013, the Octroi Zila tax was taken away from KMC and Sindh government has provided annual release of funds which were not even enough to pay the salaries of its 24,000 employees. According to the act the provincial government reserved powers to terminate any official of the local body.

The Mayor has only the function of road construction and maintenance, managing big hospitals and Karachi Medical & Dental College, Karachi Zoo, Safari Park, City Aquarium, Sports Complex, Art Gallery, Museum, Metropolitan Library, Fire Fighting, Civil Defense, Traffic Engineering, removal of encroachments and few other affairs. According to a review report, the powers of the KMC seemed strangely limited given its status as the biggest LG body in Sindh. Some key LG functions did not fall under the purview of the KMC, e.g., health, education, environment, overall development, security etc. and other functions which were included under its domain fr instance control of stray animals, brick kilns and cattle colonies seem trivial for it and more appropriate for UCs. The six DMCs were made almost independent with little connection with the Karachi Metropolitan Corporation. moreover, the DMCs (District Municipal corporations) and even UCs (Union Committees) controlled by the PPP liaise directly with the provincial government for funds and direction, bypassing the KMC.

According to world bank report, revenues of Karachi local government or KMC are inadequate, with a high dependence on fiscal transfers from Government of Sindh accounting for more than 80% of its revenue. Mandates are limited, with Government of Sindh recently "recentralizing" municipal services such as Sindh waste Management (SWM). The taxes assigned to KMC were much smaller than the ones assigned to other Local governments despite the fact that KMC was the largest LG body in Sindh

The powers of the Mayor of Karachi is as follows.

* Limited

Budget 
Karachi budget formulated by its mayors during first and last years of their tenure.

See also 
List of Mayors of Pakistan
 Commissioner Karachi Division
 Karachi Metropolitan Corporation
Administrator of Karachi
Karachi Development Authority
Karachi Water and Sewerage Board
Lyari Development Authority
Malir Development Authority

References

Karachi

Mayors, Karachi
Mayors